Tolosa, officially the Municipality of Tolosa, is a 5th class municipality in the province of Leyte, Philippines. According to the 2020 census, it has a population of 20,708 people.

The cities closest to Tolosa are Tacloban, Ormoc, Baybay, Borongan, Catbalogan, and Maasin. The nearest municipalities are Tanauan, Tabontabon, Dulag, Palo, Julita, and Dagami. Its distance from the national capital is 588.52 kilometers (365.69 miles).

History
According to popular beliefs, Tolosa derived its name from a legend about three chieftains (datus) who united their chiefdoms.  According to the legend, the area that is now Tolosa was ruled by three great datus:  the datu of fishing, the datu of harvest and the datu of hunting. Typical of chiefdoms in those times, the three datus regard each other with hostility. One time a great battle broke out among the three of them. Their people fought valiantly in defense of each datu. But the three datus were strong they could not defeat each other. Accidentally they were hit by their own swords and they died. Their blood spilt everywhere. Then came a great earthquake followed by a tsunami. When the floodwaters subsided, three promontories rose on three sides of the three datus' lands, as if acting as defensive walls of the contiguous land. Survivors of the great battle realized that the three hills were their great datus who were now united in protecting them from outside dangers.  From three (tolo) they became one (usa).

Tolosa was once part of the nearby municipality of Tanauan. Magdaleno Vivero and Domingo Camacho petitioned the Spanish Government to grant Tolosa autonomy from Tanauan. The petition was approved in 1852, resulting in great jubilation among the new town's inhabitants. The town's residents, however, continued to call a nearby promontory Inapusong after the town's old name. Spanish officials named the town in honor of Tolosa, a town in the Basque Country, Spain. The town was formally founded in 1861 and became a parish on February 12, 1863. Its first parish priest was Padre Geronimo Asenjo, a Spaniard. The first Filipino priest of the parish was Father Quintin Bautista. In 1910, a plan to abolish the municipality worried its inhabitants. Brigido Lauzon became the first civilian Mayor of Tolosa during American occupation in 1901. Owing to the efforts of Captain Daniel Romualdez, grandfather of the late Speaker Daniel Z. Romualdez, the plan to return Tolosa to the care of Tanauan was averted.

During the liberation of the Philippines in 1944, Tolosa and its north eastern neighboring towns were spared from bombardment by the United States and Philippine Commonwealth forces when Eagle Scout Valeriano Abello of barangay San Roque, including two other identified scouts braved Japanese sniper fire and directed US and Filipino fire to the exact location of Japanese batteries along Leyte's north-eastern coast. Abello's act saved the lives of thousands of Leytenos and allowed the Filipino Soldiers and Allied Forces unhampered landing on the coast.  This unhampered attack dealt the blow that broke the back of the Japanese resistance in Leyte, and ultimately The Philippines.

A few days after the return of General Douglas MacArthur and the forces of liberation in Leyte, Tolosa became the base of the U.S Navy, as well as the 6th and 13th Air Force. It was in Tanghas, a barangay in Tolosa, where the famous American composer Irving Berlin first presented his renowned composition "Heaven Watch The Philippines" together with his Filipino audience including then President Sergio Osmeña and Carlos P. Romulo. During World War II the Tolosa was part of a large US Navy base Leyte-Samar Naval Base.

About 4 decades ago, Tolosa suffered its worst environmental disaster.  The sand in the beaches of Tolosa were black until the 1970s because of the abundance of the mineral called magnetite, a naturally magnetized iron, which was a prime raw material for high quality steel. INCO (Iron, Nickel & Copper Ore), a mining company based in nearby barangay Opong, stripped the town's beaches of vegetation to get the mineral, destroying much of the wide beaches and rendering the town's coastal defenses bare against the onslaught of tidal erosion.

Then First Lady Imelda Marcos developed the area between the sea and Mt. Inapusong and built a large compound where she entertained Miss Universe candidates during the pageant held in Manila.

Geography

Barangays
Tolosa is politically subdivided into 15 barangays.

Climate

Demographics

Economy

Tourism
 Karisyuhan Festival & Tribu Bungkaras of San Roque,Tolosa Leyte 
 Kalipayan or Olot Mansion
 Romualdez Mausoleum
 Sacred Heart Shrine on top of the bulwark of Mt. Inapusong
 Miramar Beach, former U.S Navy base
 Bil-At Beach Resort
 St. Michael Parish Church
 Statue of late Speaker Daniel Z. Romualdez
 Monument of Eagle Scout Valeriano Abello, one of the three hero scouts of the Philippines during World War II.
 The steep rocky slopes of Mt. Inapusong
 Pacific-borne waves for surfing

References

External links
 [ Philippine Standard Geographic Code]
Philippine Census Information
Local Governance Performance Management System

Municipalities of Leyte (province)